Mikhail Timochine (born 20 November 1980) is a Russian former cyclist.

Major results

2001
 2nd Paris–Tours Espoirs
2002
 1st Stage 2 Thüringen Rundfahrt der U23
 1st Paris–Roubaix Espoirs
 1st Overall GP Kranj
1st Stage 2
 2nd Road race, European Under-23 Road Championships
 2nd Overall Triptyque des Monts et Châteaux
1st Stage 2b
 2nd Liège–Bastogne–Liège U23
 3rd Giro del Belvedere
 3rd Ronde van Vlaanderen U23
2004
 2nd National Road Race Championships
 2nd Uniqa Classic
 4th Tallinn–Tartu GP
2005
 3rd Tro-Bro Léon
 3rd Tartu GP

References

1980 births
Living people
Russian male cyclists
Cyclists from Moscow